Nizami Hajiyev (born 8 February 1988) is an Azerbaijani football midfielder who is currently banned from football by the AFFA.

Career

Club
Hajiyev started his career with Olimpik Baku in 2006, before moving in 2008 to Khazar Lankaran.

In May 2013 Hajiyev moved from Keshla and signed a one-year contract with Gabala. Hajiyev left Gabala on 7 August 2014.

On 30 November 2017, Keshla FK confirmed that they had terminated Hajiyev's contract due to suspicion of manipulating matches. The following day, 1 December 2017, Hajiyev was banned from all footballing activities by the AFFA.

International
He is also a member of the Azerbaijan national under-21 football team, and played for Azerbaijan's U21 side in the Euro 2009–2010 qualifiers against Austria.

Career statistics

Club

International

Statistics accurate as of match played 27 February 2012

International goals

References

External links 
 Player profile on official club website

Azerbaijani footballers
Association football midfielders
1988 births
Living people
AZAL PFK players
Khazar Lankaran FK players
Shamakhi FK players
MOIK Baku players
Gabala FC players
Azerbaijan Premier League players
Sportspeople involved in betting scandals
Azerbaijan youth international footballers
Azerbaijan under-21 international footballers
Azerbaijan international footballers